Herad Church is a parish church of the Church of Norway in Farsund Municipality in Agder county, Norway. It is located in the village of Sande, along the Åptafjorden. It is one of three churches for the Farsund parish which is part of the Lister og Mandal prosti (deanery) in the Diocese of Agder og Telemark. The white, concrete church was built in a long church design in 1957 using plans drawn up by the architect Christen A. Christensen. The church seats about 170 people.

History
The first church was probably constructed in Herad in 1570. It was a timber-framed church with a rectangular nave and a narrower, rectangular chancel. When the new church was completed, the old church was torn down. In 1948, the church burned down. As this was during the aftermath of World War II, funds were tight and the church was not rebuilt until 1957. The rebuilt church was built on the same site as the previous building.

See also
List of churches in Agder og Telemark

References

Farsund
Churches in Agder
20th-century Church of Norway church buildings
Churches completed in 1957
1570 establishments in Norway